is an interchange passenger railway station in the city of Nagareyama, Chiba, Japan, operated by both East Japan Railway Company (JR East) and the third-sector railway operating company Metropolitan Intercity Railway Company. The station is number 10 on the Tsukuba Express line.

Lines
It is located 55.4 kilometers from Fuchūhommachi Station on the Musashino Line, and 22.1 kilometers from Akihabara Station on the Tsukuba Express.

Station layout

JR East
 
The JR East station consists of two elevated opposed side platforms serving two tracks, with a bi-directional centre track used for freight services. The station building is located underneath the platforms.

Platforms

Tsukuba Express

The Tsukuba Express station consists of an underground island platform serving two tracks. The platforms were approximately 125 m long when built, to accommodate 6-car trains.

Platforms

History
Minami-Nagareyama Station opened on 1 April 1973.

The Tsukuba Express station opened on 24 August 2005, coinciding with the opening of the line.

The Tsukuba Express platforms are scheduled to be lengthened by 40 m in either direction by autumn 2012 to allow the train stopping positions to be offset, thus reducing platform crowding during peak periods.

Passenger statistics
In fiscal 2019, the JR East portion of the station was used by an average of 35,517 passengers daily (boarding passengers only). The Tsukuba Express portion of the station was used by 37,560 passengers during the same period.

Surrounding area
 Toyo Gakuen University Nagareyama Campus
 Nagareyama Post Office

See also
 List of railway stations in Japan

References

External links

 JR East Minami-Nagareyama Station 
 TX Minami-Nagareyama Station 

Railway stations in Chiba Prefecture
Railway stations in Japan opened in 1973
Stations of East Japan Railway Company
Stations of Tsukuba Express
Musashino Line
Nagareyama